No. 459 Squadron RAAF was a Royal Australian Air Force squadron that operated during World War II. It was formed in early 1942 and served as a maritime patrol and bomber unit in the Mediterranean theatre until early 1945, operating mainly Lockheed Hudson aircraft. In early 1945, the squadron was transferred to the United Kingdom with the intention of being transferred to RAF Coastal Command and converting to Vickers Wellington bombers; however, due to a series of delays the conversion was not completed and the squadron was disbanded in April 1945.

History
Raised as an Article XV squadron under the terms of the Empire Air Training Scheme, No. 459 Squadron was established at Burg-el-Arab, Egypt, on 10 February 1942 and allocated to the Royal Australian Air Force. Under the temporary command of Squadron Leader Phillip Howson, the squadron was assigned to No. 201 Group RAF, which formed part of Middle East Command, and was tasked with performing the maritime reconnaissance role. Although the squadron initially possessed only six aircraft – two Lockheed Hudsons and four Bristol Blenheims – its first operations came four days after it was formed, when two Hudsons conducted a reconnaissance mission during which an unsuccessful attack was made on a German or Italian submarine. In April, Wing Commander Keith Hennock assumed command of the unit and the following month the squadron had received its full complement of Hudsons and had ceased operating the Blenheims, which had been on loan from No. 203 Squadron RAF.

Throughout the remainder of 1942 and into early 1943, the squadron operated against German shipping in the Mediterranean, focusing mainly upon interdicting German sea lines of communication that were being used to resupply forces in North Africa. Throughout June, July and August, the Hudsons destroyed a large number of German landing craft. German losses were so heavy that the vessels were withdrawn from the area, although the Australian squadron had suffered heavy losses in achieving this. The squadron's headquarters moved several times during, with several moves between bases in Egypt, before the squadron was moved to Libya, taking up station at Gambut airfield in December 1942, where it would remain until April 1944. Additionally, detachments of the squadron were also to various places in Aden, Cyprus and Palestine, from where further missions were launched, including one that resulted in the sinking of a destroyer in September 1942. The squadron's first success over a U-boat came in June 1943, when  was sunk by a No. 459 Squadron Hudson.

In September 1943, the squadron was re-roled temporally as a level bomber unit, widening its field of operations to Crete and mainland Greece, launching several day and night operations. The squadron was equipped with Lockheed Venturas in February – March 1944, and although several operations were undertaken around the Greek Islands, the type was not considered successful and in July 1944, No. 459 Squadron was re-equipped with Martin Baltimore aircraft. Prior to the conversion, the squadron had moved its headquarters to Palestine in April 1944; it remained there until August 1944, when No. 459 was transferred back to Berka, in Libya.

No. 459 Squadron continued operating around the Greek Islands until late February 1945, when it was posted to the United Kingdom as part of a plan to transfer the squadron to Coastal Command and convert to Vickers Wellingtons. After transiting through Egypt, the move was completed by ship, and at the same time, many of the squadron's experienced aircrew were either transferred to other squadrons, or were repatriated back to Australia for rest or demobilisation. In the United Kingdom, the squadron established itself at RAF Chivenor, in Devon, but shortly after its arrival, as a result of the earlier delays, on 10 April 1945 the squadron was disbanded, having not flown its Wellingtons operationally. A total of 53 Australian personnel were killed during the war.

Aircraft operated
No 459 Squadron operated the following aircraft:

Squadron bases
No. 459 Squadron operated from the following bases and airfields:

Commanding officers
No. 459 Squadron was commanded by the following officers:

References

Notes

Bibliography

Further reading

External links

 RAAF Museum: 459 Squadron
 454 and 459 RAAF Squadrons Association
 History of the 459 RAAF Squadron
 Australian War Memorial: 459 Squadron

Australian Article XV squadrons of World War II
Military units and formations established in 1942
Military units and formations disestablished in 1945
Military units and formations in Aden in World War II
Military units and formations in Mandatory Palestine in World War II